Pribrezhny is a rural locality (a settlement) in Vostochny Selsoviet of Oktyabrsky District, Amur Oblast, Russia. The population was 89 as of 2018. There are 6 streets.

Geography 
Pribrezhny is located 13 km northeast of Yekaterinoslavka (the district's administrative centre) by road. Borisovo is the nearest rural locality.

References 

Rural localities in Oktyabrsky District, Amur Oblast